Mamdouh bin Abdul Rahman bin Saud is a Saudi prince who was the 10th president of Al-Nassr Club from 2005 to 2006.

Biography
Mamdouh bin Abdul Rahman is a grandson of King Saud and the son of Abdul Rahman bin Saud Al Saud, the godfather of Al-Nassr Club. In addition, he is the nephew of Sultan bin Saud, the 6th President of Al-Nassr and the half-brother of Faisal bin Abdul Rahman bin Saud, the 8th President of the club. In April 2015 Mamdouh was banned from joining sports-related activities in Saudi Arabia for one year due to his racist remarks.

References

Mamdouh

Al Nassr FC
Mamdouh
Year of birth missing (living people)
Living people